Yeo Ning Hong  (born 3 November 1943) is a Singaporean chemist and former politician who served as Minister for Defence between 1991 and 1994, and Minister for Communications between 1984 and 1991. A former member of the governing People's Action Party (PAP), he was the Member of Parliament (MP) representing Kim Seng SMC between 1980 and 1991, and later the Kim Seng division of Kampong Glam GRC between 1991 and 1996

Education 
Yeo studied in University of Singapore and also graduated with a PhD from the University of Cambridge. He was also a research fellow of Christ's College, Cambridge between 1970 and 1973.

Post political career 
Since retiring from politics, Yeo has been serving as Executive Chairman of the Singapore Technologies Group and Chairman of the Port of Singapore Authority. He has also published several books under the pen name "Adrian Yeo".

References

People's Action Party politicians
Members of the Parliament of Singapore
Ministers for Defence of Singapore
University of Singapore alumni
Singaporean people of Teochew descent
Living people
Recipients of the Darjah Utama Bakti Cemerlang
Communications ministers of Singapore
Singaporean chairpersons of corporations
1943 births